Little Tey is a village and former civil parish, now in the parish of Marks Tey, in the Colchester district of Essex, England, located approximately six miles west of Colchester. In 1931 the parish had a population of 78. On 26 March 1949 the parish was abolished and merged with Marks Tey.

Location 
It is near Marks Tey railway station, which is on the Great Eastern Main Line, and is a junction for the Sudbury Branch Line to Sudbury. It is near the A12 road, the A120 road and the A1124 road. It is one of a group of villages called the Teys, consisting of Marks Tey, Little Tey and Great Tey.

Church 
St. James the Less is a small and simple building of C12 Norman origins. It has several small Norman windows and an apsidal east end. The roof is thought to be 13th century and in the 14th century windows were added or enlarged to give more light. There is one bell, cast in Sudbury by Henry Pleasant. Recently uncovered were a series of 13th and 14th century wall paintings.

References

External links
 Great and Little Tey Churches website
 http://www.medievalists.net/2011/07/05/the-uncovering-and-conservation-of-the-medieval-wall-paintings-at-st-james-the-less-church-little-tey/

Villages in Essex
Former civil parishes in Essex
Borough of Colchester